Ronald, Ronnie, or Ron White may refer to:

Entertainers
 Ron White (born 1956), American comedian
 Ron White (actor) (1953–2018), Canadian actor
 Ronnie White (1939–1995), American singer/songwriter/producer

Judges
 Ronald A. White (born 1961), United States district judge for the Eastern District of Oklahoma
 Ronnie L. White (born 1953), United States district judge for the Eastern District of Missouri

Sports
 Ron White (footballer) (1920–1992), former Australian rules footballer
 Ronnie White (golfer) (1921–2005), English amateur golfer

Others
 Ron White (lawyer), appointed to the Office of Military Commissions, Guantanamo, see Michael Chapman (lawyer)
 Ronald C. White (born 1939), American historian

See also
 Ron Whyte (1941–1989), U.S. playwright
 Ronald Whyte (born 1942), United States district judge for the Northern District of California